Hugh Williams (1904–1969) was an English actor and dramatist.

Hugh Williams may also refer to:

 Sir Hugh Williams, 5th Baronet (died c. 1706) of Williams-Bulkeley baronets
 Hugh Williams (of Chester) (c. 1694–1742), Member of Parliament for Anglesey
 Sir Hugh Williams, 8th Baronet (c. 1716–1794), MP for Beaumaris (UK Parliament constituency)
 Hugh Williams (cleric) (1721/22–1779), Welsh priest and writer
 Hugh William Williams (1773–1829), Scottish landscape-painter known as "Grecian Williams"
 Sir Hugh Williams, 3rd Baronet (1802–1876)
 Hugh Williams (historian) (1843–1911), Welsh college tutor
 Hugh Pigot Williams (1858–1934), British naval officer
 Wilhelm Grosz (1894–1939), also known as Hugh Williams, Austrian composer, pianist, and conductor
 Hughie Williams (1933–2017), Australian trade unionist and Olympic wrestler
 Hugh Williams (judge) (born 1939), New Zealand judge
 Hugh C. Williams (born 1943), number theorist
 Hugh Martyn Williams (born 1946), commonly known as Hugh Williams, chartered accountant, author and Deputy National Treasurer of UKIP
 Hugh Bonneville (born 1963), English actor, born as Hugh Richard Bonniwell Williams